Dongjin is a town of Xiangzhou District, Xiangyang, Hubei, People's Republic of China, located in the eastern suburbs of the city and on the eastern (left) bank of the Han River. , it has one residential community and 53 villages under its administration.

Administrative divisions
Villages:
 Shangying, Qixiang, Dongjin, Fanying, Fanpo, Chenpo, Yishe, Ershe, Shangzhou, Zhongzhou, Xiazhou, Wangzhai, Sanhe, Liwan, Qiangang, Hougang, Weili, Zhuangchong, Chunhe, Tangchong, Qinzui, Tianchong, Pengzhuang, Yanpo, Zhouzhai, Zhupeng, Tanwan, Cuihu, Xiaogang, Yuegang, Tangdian, Sunwangying, Liudian, Houying, Shenying, Zhonglou, Yingkou, Fuzhai, Wuwan, Heli, Lüzhai, Xiaoying, Tangzhuang, Yuedi, Magang, Liugou, Zhengwan, Dahuo, Qili, Zhangzui, Zhuying, Jianpo

See also
List of township-level divisions of Hubei

References

Township-level divisions of Hubei